Philly Kid is a 2012 American drama film directed by Jason Connery, produced by After Dark Films, written by Adam Mervis.

Plot
Following ten years in a Louisiana prison after being wrongly convicted of assault and murder of a police officer, NCAA champion wrestler Dillon is paroled. Back in his home neighborhood in Baton Rouge, Louisiana, his friend Jake is in deep trouble with gamblers, and Dillon agrees to pay off his debt by cage fighting. Complications occur with Dillon's parole officer, a corrupt cop, Dillon's new girlfriend, and fight promoters. His problems compound with his victories; eventually the system demands that he throw a bout.

Cast
 Wes Chatham as Dillon "The Philly Kid" McGuire, a former high school wrestler turned MMA fighter
 Devon Sawa as Jake
 Sarah Butler as Amy
 Neal McDonough as Jim "L.A. Jim" Jacoby
 Lucky Johnson as "Ace" Reed
 Chris Browning as Detective Ray Marks
 Michael Jai White as Arthur Letts
 Bernard Hocke as Lenny
 Rich Clementi as Sanchez
 Shawn Jordan as Andrei Titov

Production 
The film was shot in Baton Rouge, Louisiana beginning in May 2011. The film's production staff included about ten department heads with ties to the Wright State University film program or Dayton, Ohio.

Release
The film was released in the United States to theatres on May 11, 2012, with an MPAA "R" rating. As part of the "After Dark Action" bundle, the film showed for one week in ten cities, and was simultaneously released for video on demand.

Reception
The Philly Kid received mixed reviews. Variety wrote that it "delivers the basic goods, if not much more, as formulaic, functional guys'-night-in entertainment", continuing that the performances and "... Jason Connery's direction are solid enough, but the pic lacks the distinctive elements that might have lifted it above routine competence." The Los Angeles Times summarized that the film "attempts to locate a drama within the world of mixed martial arts fighting, when all it really wants to do is show some fights." IndieWire noted that the film's "combat sequences are vivid and believable. Too bad about everything else", adding, "The Philly Kid never gains traction as a film about anything other than what it's about—you've seen it before you've seen it", giving the film a "C−".

The film score by Ian Honeyman was well received: it "doesn’t feel like a factory-produced piece of Hollywood, but rather a score with soul and heart", according to SoundtrackGeek.com, which gave an overall grade of 81/100.

References

External links
 
 
 
 Review at TheActionElite.com

2012 films
2012 action drama films
Films shot in Louisiana
Films set in Louisiana
American independent films
Films directed by Jason Connery
American boxing films
2012 independent films
2010s English-language films
2010s American films